John C. Norcross (born 1957) is an American professor, board-certified clinical psychologist, and author in psychotherapy, behavior change, and self-help.

He is Distinguished Professor and chair of psychology at the University of Scranton and Clinical Professor of Psychiatry at SUNY Upstate Medical University. He also maintains a part-time practice of clinical psychology in Scranton, Pennsylvania.

Norcross is author of over 400 publications and more than 23 books. His two self-help books are Changeology and Changing for Good (the latter with James O. Prochaska and Carlo C. DiClemente). His approach to therapy has been called integrative and pragmatic, inspired in part by his interest in pragmatist philosophy, an interest that dates back at least to his undergraduate years.

Norcross was born in 1957 at Cooper University Hospital in Camden, New Jersey, the son of George E. Norcross, Jr. and Carol Norcross. He and his three brothers, George Norcross III, Congressman Donald Norcross, and attorney Philip A. Norcross, were raised in Pennsauken and Merchantville, New Jersey. He graduated from Rutgers University–Camden with a B.A. in psychology, the University of Rhode Island with a M.A. and Ph.D. in clinical psychology, and then completed his internship at Brown University Medical School.

Norcross has served as president of the American Psychological Association Division of Psychotherapy, the Society of Clinical Psychology, and the Society for the Exploration of Psychotherapy Integration (SEPI). He has received many awards, such as the Distinguished Lifetime Contributions to Education & Training Award from the American Psychological Association and the Pennsylvania Professor of the Year from the Carnegie Foundation for the Advancement of Teaching. He has been elected to the National Academies of Practice.

Selected books 
Norcross, J.C., & Cooper, M. (2021). Personalizing psychotherapy: Assessing and accommodating patient preferences. Washington, DC: American Psychological Association. 
Sayette, M. A., & Norcross, J. C. (2020). Insider's Guide to graduate programs in clinical and counseling psychology. 2020/21 edition. New York: Guilford Press.
Norcross, J. C., & Goldfried, M. R. (2019). (Eds.). Handbook of psychotherapy integration (3rd ed.). New York: Oxford University Press.
Norcross, J. C., & Lambert, M. J. (2019). (Eds.). Psychotherapy relationships that work. Volume 1: Evidence-based therapist contributions (3rd ed.). New York: Oxford University Press.
Norcross, J. C., & Wampold, B. E. (2019). (Eds.). Psychotherapy relationships that work. Volume 2: Evidence-based responsiveness (3rd ed.). New York: Oxford University Press.
Norcross, J. C., & VandenBos, G. R. (2018). Leaving it at the office: A guide to psychotherapist self-care (2nd ed.). New York: Guilford Press.
Prochaska, J. O., & Norcross, J. C. (2018). Systems of psychotherapy: A transtheoretical analysis (9th ed.). New York: Oxford University Press. 
Norcross, J. C., & Popple, L. M. (2017). Supervision essentials for integrative psychotherapy. Washington, DC: American Psychological Association.  
Norcross, J. C., Hogan, T. P., Koocker, G. P., & Maggio, L. A. (2017). Clinician's guide to evidence-based practices: Behavioral health and addictions (2nd ed.). New York: Oxford University Press. 
Norcross, J. C., VandenBos, G. R., & Freedheim, D. F. (Eds.) (2016). APA handbook of clinical psychology (5 volumes). Washington, DC: American Psychological Association. 
Norcross, J. C., Campbell, L. M., Grohol, J. M., Santrock, J. W., Selagea, F., & Sommer, R. (2013). Self-help that works: resources to improve emotional health and strengthen relationships (4th ed.). New York: Oxford University Press. 
Norcross, J. C. (2013). Changeology: 5 steps to realizing your goals and resolutions. New York: Simon & Schuster. 
Norcross, J. C., VandenBos, G. R., & Freedheim, D. K. (Eds.). (2011). History of psychotherapy: continuity and change (2nd ed). Washington, DC: American Psychological Association. 
Prochaska, J. O., Norcross, J. C. & DiClemente, C. C. (1994). Changing for good: the revolutionary program that explains the six stages of change and teaches you how to free yourself from bad habits. New York: Morrow.

References 

1957 births
Integrative psychotherapy
Living people
State University of New York Upstate Medical University faculty
21st-century American psychologists
Rutgers University alumni
People from Camden County, New Jersey
University of Scranton faculty
20th-century American psychologists